The Godfathers is an Australian comedy drama television series which aired on the Nine Network from 1971 to 1972. This family series was created by Robert Bruning and Michael Laurence, who also had starring roles.

Plot summary
The Godfathers follows the story of widow Maria Varga, who decides to take in boarders into her house to help make ends meet. Her young son Mike is initially opposed to the idea and resents the new boarders until they throw him a surprise birthday party. He adopts the three boarders as his 'godfathers'.

Cast
 Anna Volska as Maria Varga
 Ashley Grenville as Mike Varga
 Robert Bruning as Chris Johnson
 Michael Laurence as Peter Fairhall
 Eric Oldfield as Gary Peterson
 Harold Hopkins as David Milson
 Tina Grenville as Elizabeth Dent
 Eve Wynne as Mrs. Parsons 
 Queenie Ashton as Mrs. Frenchman

Production
Child Welfare Officer Elizabeth Dent was played by Tina Grenville, who was the real life mother of Ashley Grenville, who starred as Mike Varga.

When writing, producing and starring in the series became too much for Michael Laurence, he wrote his character Pete out of the series after 26 episodes but returned for guest appearances. He was replaced by a new godfather Dave, until the series ended at 72 episodes.

The theme song for the series was written and performed by Michael Caulfield.

Spin-off
A spin-off series The People Next Door was created as a replacement series and screened in 1973 for 20 episodes. It featured two characters from The Godfathers, Elizabeth Dent and David Milson. The series began with Elizabeth and her husband Bill Dunstan moving into a new house and taking in Dave as a boarder.

Awards
The Godfathers won the Logie Award for Best Comedy Series at the Logie Awards of 1973.

References

External links
 
 The Godfathers at Classic Australian TV

1971 Australian television series debuts
1972 Australian television series endings
Australian drama television series
1970s Australian comedy television series
Nine Network original programming
English-language television shows